The John Platts House, at 364 Quince St. in Salt Lake City, Utah, was built in 1858.

It is termed by the Utah Heritage Foundation as an "excellent example of Utah's early architecture" and is included in the locally defined Marmalade Hill Historic District.

It is a "good example" of a pioneer home.

The house was listed on the National Register of Historic Places in 1972.

References

Houses on the National Register of Historic Places in Utah
Houses completed in 1858
Houses in Salt Lake City
National Register of Historic Places in Salt Lake City